Play School is an Australian educational television show for children produced by the Australian Broadcasting Corporation (ABC). It is the longest-running children's show in Australia and the second-longest-running children's show worldwide after British series Blue Peter.

An estimated 80% of pre-school children under six watch the program at least once a week. It is screened three times each weekday on ABC Kids, at 9 am, 11:30 am and 3:30 pm (from 7 July 2014) and twice daily each weekend at 9 am and 3:30 pm.

Play School was admitted to the Logies' Hall of Fame in 2006, the program's 40th anniversary year. It is one of only five Australian television programs to be inducted.

History
 
Play School premiered on 18 July 1966 and was based on the British program of the same name. (The British version started in 1964 and ended in 1988; the show's format was then sold to Australia.) The first episode began transmitting that day, as the program was originally transmitted live. It has been produced continuously from this time. It has also launched the careers of several Australian actors and television presenters. It was admitted to the Logies' Hall of Fame on its 40th anniversary in 2006, in recognition of the strong influence the show has had on at least three generations of Australian children.

Play School was the third show to enter the Logies' Hall of Fame in its own right, after Four Corners (1992) and Neighbours (2005). It was also the first children's show inducted into the hall of fame.

During the 2006 Logie Awards, a package showing memorable scenes from the show throughout its history was shown, before notable presenters (from past and present) came onto the stage with some of the favourite toys from the show. After these presenters accepted the award, the audience then joined them for a stirring rendition of the Play School theme.

In 1992, a through-the-windows segment featured an early performance by the Australian children's musical group the Wiggles performing the songs "Get Ready to Wiggle" and "Rock-a-Bye Your Bear" at a day care centre.

On Monday 4 July 2011, Play School updated its opening titles using a combination of stop motion and computer animation with a new arrangement of the theme song sung by presenters Jay Laga'aia and Justine Clarke.

50th anniversary
In 2016, Play School celebrated 50 years on the air and had a month of celebrations.

To mark its 50th anniversary, from 4 July the program presented a series of cover songs called Play School Celebrity Covers.

List of covers

On 18 July at 6:30 pm, ABC also broadcast a special 50th anniversary Play School celebrity covers special that featured Hamish & Andy singing "There's a Hole in My Bucket"; John Hamblin, "I'm a Little Teapot"; Dan Sultan, "The Wheels on the Bus"; Molly Meldrum and Charlie Pickering, "Nursery Rhyme News"; Delta Goodrem, "Twinkle Twinkle Little Star" & "Moon Moon"; Benita Collings & Don Spencer, "Teddy Bears Picnic"; Josh Thomas, "Ning Nang Nong"; Annabell Crabb and Leigh Sales, "Singing in the Kitchen"; Guy Sebastian, "Singing in the Rain"; Magda Szubanski, "Old Mother Hubbard"; and You Am I, "One Potato, Two Potato". In 2020, all of the existing Celebrity Covers episodes were rebranded as part of a new spin-off series Play School Show Time, which features new celebrities singing covers of songs from the series.

On 8 July 2019, Aboriginal presenters Luke Carroll, Miranda Tapsell and Hunter Page-Lochard hosted a special episode featuring an Acknowledgement of Country celebrating Australia's first people, sharing knowledge of Aboriginal and Torres Strait Islander culture and highlighting the importance of caring for Country together. A new doll, "Kiya", was introduced to the program. Matthew Doyle played a digeridoo.

Spin offs
There have also been various spin-offs from Play School which have been played on ABC Kids, typically much shorter in duration. These include Little Ted's Big Adventure, Jemima's Big Adventure, Big Ted's Big Adventure, Humpty's Big Adventure, Maurice's Big Adventure, Joey's Big Adventure, Play School Story Time, Play School Art Time, Play School Nursery Rhyme News Time, Play School Art Crew, Play School Song Time, Play School Science Time, Play School Show Time and Play School Story Time: Languages.

Format
The format of the show is activities, songs and games with either host passing back to each other at the end of their segment, and frequently joining each other in activities. Each day the presenters look at the calendar to find out which day of the week it is, read a story, and look through the windows. From 1976 to 2000, they had a clock shaped like a rocket, and from 1966 to 2000, a clock shaped like a flower. Until 2000, the windows looked almost exactly like their British counterparts with a few slight differences. They changed the background behind the windows from black to white at the end of 1967 and they then changed it to light blue in 1985. In 1987 Play School had a mild makeover for its 21st anniversary on air; there was a mild cosmetic revamp to the set, with a new set of opening and closing titles with a new version of the theme song sung by presenters, Philip Quast and Jennifer Ludlam. The windows also changed to look like to ones used on the British version of the show, but this change was not well received and the windows reverted to their old style by 1988, which remained until the major 2000 revamp.

In 1992 there was a set revamp with new shelving and coloured tree shapes in the background; this change was done about midway through the 1992 production season, with earlier 1992 episodes retaining the older 1980s set.

Every week there is a common theme running through the program that the actors reflect upon during the episode; themes include Dinosaurs, Opposites, Zoo Animals, Food, Clothes, Games, Art, Hair, Hats, Shapes, Road Safety and vehicles. Each theme (or block of five episodes) were repeated twice a year on average for a period of six to seven years, before it was recycled and reused in new episodes. As funding was limited, only 45 new episodes were made each year, which means that nine weekly blocks shown each year were new episodes, the rest repeats.

In 2000, the show had a considerable revamp, with the rocket and flower clocks and the three windows put in storage in favour of a newer-style Play School. The main clock was now simply called the Play School Clock, which was controlled by one of the presenters standing at the top of the clock and turning a winding device, which caused the clue to the story to slide down a slippery dip. That was soon replaced by the Hickory Dickory Clock which featured clockwork resembling the "Hickory Dickory" nursery rhyme. That was soon replaced by the Train Clock which resembles a train station with a clock above it. The windows were also heavily changed. They were now built into a large rotating prop which was built underneath the clock (shown one week) and 'controlled' by one of the presenters pulling a lever back and forwards. The windows (now including a diamond window) would spin around and would slowly be eliminated as the window they would look through until they got to the fourth window and the camera would slowly zoom in and fade out into the fill. The order in which they appear is Square~Diamond~Round~Arched. That was soon replaced by windows with animation where Jemima stands next to the round window, Little Ted stands next to the square window, Big Ted stands next to the diamond window and Humpty stands next to the arched window and the window chosen goes through to pre-recorded footage.

Presenters
Australian musician Don Spencer is a noted presence on the program, having not only been a presenter for some 28 years but also releasing several related tie-in records. He also appeared with Diana Dorgan, the only presenter to appear on both the Australian and British versions, although Lorraine Bayly briefly appeared on the British version in 1972 as a storyteller

Play School has had many presenters, however several remained (or remain) with the series for a long period. Australian actress Benita Collings (30 years) and British-Australian actor John Hamblin (29 years) are the longest-serving.

The program's long-term hosts have also included: Alister Smart (25 years), Noni Hazlehurst (23 years), Andrew McFarlane, Simon Burke (20 years), Karen Pang (22 years) and Justine Clarke (21 years).

While the show is written by preschool education experts, the presenters are all well-known actors or musicians who can connect well with the target audience.

Music

Pianists
The program has historically had a musical director, who served as a pianist who played live music to accompany the presenters on each episode. Occasionally the pianist would make an on-camera appearance, one of the more well known being Warren Carr who served as musical director for over 20 years.

The pianists who have worked on Play School are:
 Bill Antman (1966–1972)
 Judy Bailey (1970s–1990)
 Penny Biggins (1991–1994)
 Warren Carr (1972–1993)
 Peter J Casey (1996–2004)
 Ron Creager (1998)
 Peter Dasent (2000–present)
 Rob Eastwood (2000) – after revamp
 Max Lambert (1991–1999, 2004)
 Paul McDermott (1991–1994)
 Brian Castles Onion (2003–2009)
 Lindsay Partridge (1994)
 Elliott Wilshier (1994–1999)
 Franky Valentyn (2000s)
 Stuart Hunter (2014–present)

Theme song
The Play School theme song, "There's a Bear in There", was composed by Australian composer Richard Connolly, with lyrics by Rosemary Milne.

"There's a bear in there,
and a chair as well.
There are people with games,
and stories to tell.
Open wide, come inside;
it's Play School."

In 2016, the song was remixed by Andre Butterworth aka Copycatt as the winner of the Triple J Play School remix competition which, along with two other remixes by KLP and Jondrette Den respectively, appeared on the Play School album Famous Friends: Celebrating 50 Years of Play School.

In 2017, "There's a Bear in There" was inducted into the National Film and Sound Archive's Sounds of Australia registry.

Albums
Hey Diddle Diddle (1976)
Hickory Dickory (1978)
Humpty Dumpty (1981)
Wiggerly Woo (1984)
There's a Bear in There (1987)
...It's Play School (1991)
The Best of Play School (1993)
Oomba Baroomba (1994)
Play School Favourites (1996)
In The Car (1997)
Hullabaloo (1999)
Favourite Play School Nursery Rhymes (2002)
Hip Hip Hooray (2002)
Sing-a-Long Songs (2004)
Let's Play Together (2011)
Come and Play 45th Anniversary (2011)
Big Ted, Prince of Bears (2014)
Favourite Things Songs and Nursery Rhymes from Play School (2014)
Play School: Jemima's Big Adventure (2015)
Once Upon a Time (2015)
Famous Friends: Celebrating 50 Years of Play School (2016)
Play School: 50 Best Songs (2016)
Very Jazzy Street Party (2022)

Awards and nominations

AACTA Awards

TV Week Logie Awards

ARIA Music Awards

AIMIA Awards

Toys

 Big Ted (teddy bear) (1966–present)
 Little Ted (teddy bear) (1966–present)
 Hamble (plastic doll) (1966–1993)
 Jemima (rag doll) (1966–present)
 Humpty (white egg-shaped toy with eyes, nose and mouth, which resembles Humpty Dumpty) (1966–present)
 Slush (toy pig) (1970s–present)
 Maurice (teddy bear) (1987–present)
 Meeka (plastic doll of possibly mixed Asian descent) (1993–present)
 Dan (plastic doll of Australian Aboriginal descent) (2010s)
 Jim (plastic doll of Australian Aboriginal descent) (1985-2000s)
 Scrap (toy dog) (70s or 80s–present)
 Diddle (toy cat) (1966–present)
 Fergus (toy frog) (1994–present)
 Sam the Lamb (toy lamb) (1980s or '90s–present)
 Banana (banana-shaped toy wearing pyjamas, see also Bananas in Pyjamas) (1976–2010)
 Daisy (toy cow) ('80s or '90s–present)
 Henny Penny (toy hen) ('80s or '90s–present)
 Goosy Lucy (toy goose) ('80s or '90s)
 Kim (plastic doll and Lisa's twin brother which both of them are of Korean descent) ('80s or '90s–present)
 Lisa (plastic doll and Kim's twin sister which both of them are of Korean descent) (80s or '90s–present)
 Darcy (toy donkey) ('90s or 2000s–present)
 Henry and Henrietta (toy mice)
 Troy And Tony (twin teddy bears) ('90s or 2000s)
 Owl (toy owl) ('90s to 2000s–present)
 Tippy (toy duck) (2011–present)
 Mukundan Jr (toy lion) (2000s or 2010s)
 Fido (toy dog) (2000s to 2010s)
 Joey (toy kangaroo) Designed by award-winning children's book illustrator Bruce Whatley and introduced in the 50th anniversary edition 'Come to the Party' tx 18 July 2016 by presenter Miranda Tapsell.
 Kiya (doll of Australian Aboriginal descent) in an Acknowledgement of Country special for NAIDOC week 2019

Teachings
From the inception of the program, the producers of Play School have made efforts to promote equality, playful education, and a love of learning in its audience. Working on Play School has come to be considered an unusually demanding and important job for some actors, because they feel they are becoming part of a generation of children's lives and providing a foundation for learning things that will last for life.

Play School'''s stated philosophy is to encourage a child "to wonder, to think, to feel and to imagine". The duo (sometimes a trio when joined by hearing impaired actress Sofya Gollan) of presenters (now almost always a male-female pairing, but sometimes two females or two males) address the child directly and personally, so that every child watching the show feels that they are spending time with two people they know and can trust. Into this relationship are woven the stories, songs and activities that form the fabric of Australian children's culture.

Controversies
"Two mums"
On 31 May 2004, during a "through the windows" segment narrated by Brenna Harding, the sentence "My Mums are taking me and my friend Merryn to an amusement park." The clip was raised as controversial by sections of the media, and three federal ministers expressed dislike over the screening of the clip. The ABC responded, however, by saying that "Play School aims to reflect the diversity of Australian children, embracing all manner of race, religions and family situations." The producers of the segment also said the segment showed the girl being accompanied by her birth mother and her step mother (hence "two mums") and they believed most people would automatically assume the same. What was shown was taken by the public to be two lesbians taking their child and her friend to an amusement park.

Constructing a "bong"
A 2013 segment showed Alex Papps constructing some kind of contraption which involved a straw inserted through the side of a plastic bottle, which was then filled with hot water, accidentally resembling a bong. This controversy arose again in 2015, when the segment was replayed.

"Grooming" accusation
In October 2022, Courtney Act appeared on an episode of spin-off Play School Story Time, where she read The Spectacular Suit by Kat Patrick. Her appearance generated considerable media attention when Senator Alex Antic took issue with the ABC inviting a drag queen to read a book to children about a girl who favoured wearing pants instead of a dress, which he described in a Senate Estimates hearing as "grooming". Questioning ABC managing director David Anderson, Antic asked why the ABC was "grooming Australian children with this sort of adult content" and asking Anderson whether such content was contributing to a "gender dysphoria problem". Anderson denied this, while Greens senator Sarah Hanson-Young accused Antic of using "deeply offensive" language. Act defended her appearance on Play School Story Time in an opinion piece she wrote in The Sydney Morning Herald and during an appearance on The Project.Logo historyPlay School has had a number of openers and logos throughout its long history. Originating as simple animations with vocals from select presenters, the logos and their respective openers have evolved over the many years of the series. The most recent logo, introduced in 2011, features an opener made entirely of stop-motion animation with vocals by presenters Justine Clarke and Jay Laga'aia.

Presenters

See also

 List of Australian television series
 List of programs broadcast by ABC Television
 List of longest-running Australian television series
 Sesame Street Captain Kangaroo Play School (UK TV series) Play School (New Zealand TV series) Mister Rogers' Neighborhood Polka Dot Door Play Away Playdays Tikkabilla Zoom''

Notes

References

External links

 
 

1966 Australian television series debuts
1960s Australian television series
1970s Australian television series
1980s Australian television series
1990s Australian television series
2000s Australian television series
2010s Australian television series
ARIA Award winners
Australian Broadcasting Corporation original programming
Australian children's television series
Australian preschool education television series
1960s preschool education television series
1970s preschool education television series
1980s preschool education television series
1990s preschool education television series
2000s preschool education television series
2010s preschool education television series
Black-and-white Australian television shows
English-language television shows
Television series by Endemol
Television series by Endemol Australia
Television shows set in Sydney
Australian television series based on British television series